John Edmund Mills (2 September 1882 – 11 November 1951) was Labour MP for Dartford for three separate periods during the 1920s.

Born in Perth in Australia, Mills grew up in Plymouth, being educated at the city's Higher Grade School.  He became an engineer based at the Royal Arsenal in Woolwich, and was elected as chair of the works' Shop Stewards' Committee.

Mills was a supporter of the Labour Party, and was elected as a Member of Parliament at the 1920 Dartford by-election.  Although he lost the seat at the 1922 United Kingdom general election, he won it back in 1923, serving as Parliamentary Private Secretary to Josiah Wedgwood.  He lost again in 1924, won in 1929, and was finally defeated in 1931.

Mills also served on Woolwich Borough Council, and was President of the National Housing Association in 1921.

References

External links 
 

1882 births
1951 deaths
Amalgamated Engineering Union-sponsored MPs
Councillors in Greater London
Labour Party (UK) MPs for English constituencies
Sportspeople from Dartford
UK MPs 1918–1922
UK MPs 1923–1924
UK MPs 1929–1931